Thanga Meenkal is a 2013 Indian Tamil-language drama film directed by Ram in his second directorial venture after Kattradhu Thamizh. The story was written by Ram and his daughter Shri Sankara Gomathy Ram, with the former, besides, played the lead role as well alongside newcomers Sadhana and Shelly Kishore. The film is jointly produced by Gautham Vasudev Menon and J. Satish Kumar under the banners Photon Kathaas and JSK Film Corporation, respectively.

It follows, Kalyani a poor man who is forced to live under the shade of his father, takes up a job beyond his reach to provide his daughter a good living. The film's cinematography was handled by Arbhindu Saaraa, and editing done by A. Sreekar Prasad. The film's score and soundtrack composed by Yuvan Shankar Raja. The film's shooting commenced in mid-January 2011 and was completed by late 2011. The film was released on 30 August 2013, opening to positive reviews from critics, but was declared as an average grosser by box office analysts.

The film won three prizes at the 61st National Film Awards, which includes the Best Tamil Film Award, Best Child Artist Award for Sadhana, and Best Lyricist  for Na. Muthukumar. The film won 3 Filmfare Awards, 3 South Indian International Movie Awards and one Vijay Award. It was the only Tamil film to be screened at Indian Panorama in International Film Festival of India, held at Goa in 2013. The film was also screened at the 11th Chennai International Film Festival in 2014, with a Special Award for Sadhana.

Plot
A poor laborer named Kalyani is devoted to his young daughter Chellamma, but the child has problems at school with her studies, classmates, and teachers. Kalyani wants Chellamma to be happy, no matter what. Kalyani is a man who toils pretty hard to meet both ends, thereby trying not to live in his father's shade, but is forced to. Chellama is a sweet, angelic girl who fares below average in the class but is all chirpy and gleeful when she is with her father. Without a proper job and an income the tension that prevails in the house forces Kalyani to take up a job far away from the reach of Chellamma. 'Thanga Meengal' is a coming-of-age story of a father struggling to make ends meet, told through the eyes of his eight-year-old daughter. The film offers a critique of primary education in Tamil Nadu and makes poignant observations through social commentary.

Cast

 Ram as Kalyani
 Baby Sadhana as Chellamma
 Shelly Kishore as Vadivu
 Rohini as Parvathi
 Padmapriya as Evita
 Aruldoss as Evita's husband
 Nivas Adithan
 Lizzie Antony as Stella Miss
 Poo Ramu as Kalyani's father
 Ramya as Kalyani's sister 
 Baby Sanjana  as Nithyashree 
 Master Adithya as Adithya

Production
After his debut directorial Kattradhu Thamizh, Ram was expected to commence his second project, which was tentatively titled Saddam Hussain and was to star Dhanush and Bhavana. However, the commercial failure of Kattradhu Thamizh hindered him from starting his next directorial immediately after, with no producer willing to fund the project. Furthermore, comedian Karunas, who played a pivotal role in that film and had bought the distribution rights of the film, lost around  75 lakhs and demanded compensation for the loss. Ram took a break before starting work on his next project. He had penned a story titled Thanga Meengal and, as claimed by reports in August 2009, had eventually found a producer to fund this film under the banner of Touch Stone. Comedian Karunas, school mate of Ram, who played a lead role in the director's first film, too, was roped in to play the lead role in this film. The film's shoot was supposed to begin in late 2009, but got delayed and didn't take off until mid-2010. Media reports claimed that the producer got into a financial crisis and decided to drop the film, which prompted Karunas to take up the film and produce it himself. However, the film was subsequently taken over by director-producer Gautham Vasudev Menon, whose Photon Kathaas Productions along with R. S. Infotainment would produce the film. Gautham asked Ram to enact the protagonist's role, which he agreed to after shooting rehearsal scenes with Suba Pandian and cinematographer P. G. Muthiah and being "thoroughly convinced".

Thanga Meengal was disclosed to illustrate the story of a middle-aged man who gets separated from his wife and daughter to search for a job "just for the sake of earning money". Ram declared that the female lead and other characters would be enacted by newcomers, one of them being an eight-year-old Chennai-based girl Sadhana Venkatesh. Director Ram auditioned over 150 girls for the role of Chellamma before he zeroed in on her. Malayalam television actress Shelly Kishore was roped in to play the mother character, Vadivu. Filming was finally started on 18 January 2011 in Nagercoil.
In January 2012, Padmapriya was roped in for an important role, making a comeback to Tamil films  after a gap of 3 years. The shoot of the entire film was completed in 53 days and it was held in places like Wayanad, Cochin, Nagercoil, Achankoil and other scenic locations.

Soundtrack

Following the success of the soundtrack of Kattradhu Thamizh, director Ram collaborated with composer Yuvan Shankar Raja and lyricist Na. Muthukumar again, for the soundtrack and score for Thanga Meenkal. The soundtrack album features four songs. Alphons Joseph, Rahul Nambiar, Sriram Parthasarathy and Baby Sadhana and Baby Sanjana, who acted in the film, provided vocals for the songs, for which, director Ram described the song as "an anthem for school children" that would speak about the current education system, examinations and teachers." The team created a special album featuring school children with Yuvan Shankar Raja also making an appearance in the video. The track list of the film was released by Sony Music, which marketed the film's soundtrack on 1 July 2013. The soundtrack album was released on 19 July 2013 at Sathyam Cinemas in Chennai, along with the albums of Varuthapadatha Valibar Sangam and Desingu Raja. Directors Lingusamy, Prabhu Solomon, Vetrimaran, Samuthirakani, Chimbudevan, Cheran and Balu Mahendra were present at the event and Anirudh Ravichander, Karthik, Alphonse Joseph and the two girls in the film sang an unplugged version of all the songs. The song "Aanandha Yaazhai" won rave reviews and was celebrated in entire Tamil Nadu.

Track list

Reception

The album was listed at the 12th position of "Top 25 Albums of 2013" by Behindwoods. The song "Aanandha Yaazhai" won rave reviews and was celebrated in entire Tamil Nadu. The song was listed at #1 in Behindwoods Best Songs of the year, and also topped in popular FM Charts. Behindwoods gave the album 3.5 stars out of 5 and wrote, "Yuvan Shankar Raja has again delivered his best for Ram and you will have plenty of hair-raising moments as he weaves magic with his instruments, for the movie's BGM score." Indiaglitz wrote, "Yuvan's BGM is spot on and delivers quite well. The signature tune that echoes through the movie dwells well with the movie's pace" and rated 3.25 out of 5, to the album. Moviecrow rated the album 6.5 out of 10 stating "Yuvan Shankar raja has done justice to the music and this will be a stand-out album. He has also given ample opportunity for innovative picturization and cuts. The music is soul-stirring and has definitely managed to portray dad-daughter relationship in a poetic way." Milliblog gave positive review stating "Two songs stand out in Thanga Meengal, that is shades below Yuvan-Ram’s earlier collaboration." Kaushik LM rated the album 4 out of 5 stating "Yuvan is in top form delivering Thanga Meengal and he proves that he is a perfect mix of the old school and the new world." Lakshmansruthi.com stated "A superb soundtrack from the Kattradhu Tamizh trio (Yuvan-Ram-Muthukumar)", and rated 4 out of 5. The Times of India, gave 3 out of 5 stars to the album stating, "Three songs in the album start off with dialogues that clearly spell out that the theme of the film revolves around the relationship between dad and daughter. The album proves that Yuvan Shankar Raja still has much musical prowess and should try out such themes apart from his regular musical offerings."

Release
The distribution rights were acquired by JSK Film Corporation. The film released on 30 August 2013.

Thanga Meenkal was selected for screening at the 44th International Film Festival of India which was held in Goa in November 2013. It was the only Tamil fim among 25 films selected for screening at the Indian Panorama section. The film was also screened in the non-competitive section ("Children's World") at the 18th International Children's Film Festival India held in Hyderabad from 14 to 20 November 2013. The film was named the best film in the 11th Chennai International Film Festival, while Sadhana was given the best child artist award.

Marketing 
The film's first look posters were released on 27 June 2012. The theatrical trailer of the film was released on 15 March 2013, and screened in theatres along with Paradesi.

Reception
The film received critical acclaim. Rediff gave 4 stars out of 5 and wrote, "Thanga Meenkal is a heartwarming story told brilliantly with a simplicity and honesty that is seen so rarely in films these days". Behindwoods gave 3.75 stars out of 5 and wrote, "Thanga Meengal brims with heart felt heavy emotions, has lifelike performances and is a brilliantly made film". IBN Live gave 3.5 out of 5 and wrote, "Barring few minor flaws, Thanga Meengal cuts you deep emotionally and achieves what several films in the recent past couldn't". The Times of India gave 3.5 stars out of 5 and wrote, "Thanga Meenkal shares many of Kattradhu Thamizhs film's strengths and flaws. It is a well-intentioned effort, strikingly shot, and held together by persuasive performances. At the same time, it is also relentlessly grim and bludgeons you into submitting to the point of view of the filmmaker, and by the time it ends, makes you believe you have personally gone through the ordeals of the film's characters. But, thankfully, it doesn't have the intense — and incredibly misplaced — anger that scorched through the latter, to leave you feeling miserable in the end. In its place, there is a welcome amount of poetry and grey, and a little bit of warmth, which shows a filmmaker evolving, trying to polish off his rough edges". Sify wrote, "Thangameengal is an honest and brave attempt by director Ram, though not in the same league as his Kattradhu Thamizh. It is a simple, heart-warming tale of love and bonding between a father and daughter, told in a high pitched melodramatic way". Indiaglitz gave 3 stars out of 5 wrote, "Ram deserves a special mention for his direction cum acting, with only two movies he has proved his mettle and Kollywood needs more directors like him no doubt". In contrast, The New Indian Express wrote, "A film should either entertain or be inspiring and stir one emotionally. Unfortunately, Thanga Meengal does neither". However, its review was lambasted by its readers in comments section. Baradwaj Rangan of The Hindu wrote "(Director Ram) clearly thinks about what he’s doing, how he’s shaping his material. There are unusual point-of-view shots...but these stray stretches are undone by the director’s aggressiveness."

Awards and nominations61st National Film AwardsBest Tamil film
Best Lyrics - Na. Muthukumar for "Ananda Yaazhai"
Best Child Artist - Sadhana61st Filmfare Awards SouthBest Tamil Film
Best Lyrics - Na. Muthukumar for "Ananda Yaazhai"
Best Male Playback Singer - Sriram Parthasarathy for "Aananda Yaazhai"
Best Director - Ram (Nominated)
Best Supporting Actress - Padmapriya Janakiraman (Nominated)8th Vijay AwardsBest Tamil Film
Best Director - Ram (Nominated)
Best Male Playback Singer - Sriram Parthasarathy for "Ananda Yaazhai" (Nominated)3rd South Indian International Movie Awards Best Actress in a Supporting Role - Shelly Kishore (Nominated)
 Best Child Artist - Sadhana
 Best Lyrics - Na. Muthukumar for "Ananda Yaazhai"
 Best Male Playback Singer - Sriram Parthasarathy for "Ananda Yaazhai"Other awards'''
 Kalvi Foundation Tribute Award 2013
 Chennai International Film Festival 2014 Special Award - Sadhna
 Tamil Nadu Media Council Award
 Best Child Artist - Sadhna
 RKV Film Institute Awards
 Best Child Artist - Sadhna

 Legacy 
Sudhish Kamath later picked Thanga Meenkal'' as one of five Tamil films that have redefined Tamil cinema in 2013, calling it "a heart-warming story about a father-daughter bond" and "a film treated with great restraint and understatement, one that rarely lapses into melodrama". He further wrote, "It’s never easy to direct and act at the same time, but director Ram manages to extract a fantastic performance from even the child actor Sadhna. But the reason it won me over is the painstaking cinematography. We haven’t seen better use of landscape in storytelling, and the director of photography Arbindhu Saara has literally climbed mountains for seconds of diegetic credibility and exhaustive coverage of ambience and location. World-class visuals."

References

External links
 

2010s children's drama films
Indian children's drama films
Films about the education system in India
Films shot in Tamil Nadu
Films shot in Kerala
Films shot in Kochi
Films shot in Alappuzha
Films shot in Thiruvananthapuram
2013 films
Films scored by Yuvan Shankar Raja
2010s Tamil-language films
Best Tamil Feature Film National Film Award winners